United States Army Deputy Chief of Staff G-8 (DCS G-8) is part of the Department of the Army Headquarters (HQDA) and reports to the Chief of Staff of the United States Army (CSA) and Vice Chief of Staff of the United States Army (VCSA).

Mission
The DCS G-8 is responsible for integrating Army funding, fielding, and equipping actions with the Office of the Secretary of Defense (OSD), Joint, and Army Staff (ARSTAF) organizations and processes for the purpose of meeting current and future force requirements of the Joint Force. The DCS G-8 is the principal military advisor to United States Assistant Secretary of the Army for Financial Management and Comptroller (ASA (FM&C)) and advises VCSA on Joint Requirements Oversight Council (JROC) issues as well. The DCS G-8 also serves as a member of Joint Capabilities Board (JCB), Army Requirements and Resourcing Board (AR2B), Army Requirements Oversight Council (AROC), and Army-Marine Corps Board (AMCB).

List of Deputy Chiefs of Staff for Programs

See also
 Chief of Staff of the United States Army
 Vice Chief of Staff of the United States Army

Notes

References

Department of the Army staff
Military simulation